Tsitsernakaberd is the official memorial to the Armenian genocide victims in Yerevan, Armenia. It was opened in 1967 after a mass demonstration that took place in Yerevan on April 24, 1965, on the 50th anniversary of the deportation of hundreds of Armenian intellectuals from Constantinople that marked the beginning of the genocide. After Armenia's independence from the Soviet Union in 1991, the memorial became a part of official ceremonies. Since then, almost every foreign official who visited Armenia included a visit to the memorial to pay tribute to the victims of the genocide. A visit to Tsitsernakaberd often includes a tour in the nearby museum. Some notable visitors have planted trees at the memorial.

A wide range of politicians, artists, musicians, athletes, and religious figures have visited the memorial. The most notable ones include Presidents of Russia (Boris Yeltsin, Vladimir Putin, Dmitry Medvedev), France (Jacques Chirac, Nicolas Sarkozy, François Hollande), Ukraine, Czech Republic, Poland, Greece, Georgia, Iran, Belarus, Romania, Lebanon, Croatia, Serbia, and Prime Ministers of Bulgaria, Czech Republic and other countries. Foreign Ministers of many countries (including US Secretary of State Hillary Clinton and several high-ranking officials of the European Union — including José Manuel Barroso and Herman Van Rompuy) — have honored the victims by visiting Tsitsernakaberd. Other visitors include Pope John Paul II in 2001, Pope Francis in 2016, the Chief Rabbi of Israel Yona Metzger, the Primate of All England Rowan Williams, the Patriarch of the Russian Orthodox Church Kirill I of Moscow, World Chess champion Vladimir Kramnik, World football champion Youri Djorkaeff, English rock star Ian Gillan, Serbian filmmaker Emir Kusturica, French actors Gérard Depardieu and Alain Delon, Nobel Prize winner in Physics Zhores Alferov.

No current Turkish state official has visited Tsitsernakaberd.

Significance and controversies
Recognition of the Armenian Genocide is one of the most important foreign policy issues of Armenia, and is the number one goal of the diaspora Armenian organizations. Many Armenians look at these visits as a sign of recognition of the genocide.

Pope John Paul II's visit in 2001
Pope John Paul II arrived in Yerevan on September 25, 2001 to participate in the celebrations of 1,700th anniversary of the adoption of Christianity as the national religion of Armenia. The Pope visited the memorial the next day after meeting with President Robert Kocharyan. He laid a wreath for the victims of the genocide, made a short speech, and read a prayer. The Pope used the term Metz Yeghern (the Armenian word for genocide, which literally translates as "Great Crime") in his prayer, causing a controversy regarding whether he recognized the events of 1915 as a genocide or not. Nevertheless, it aroused a wave of discontent in Turkey.

Hillary Clinton's visit in 2010
U.S. Secretary of State Hillary Clinton arrived in Yerevan on July 4, 2010 on America's independence day, thus becoming the highest-ranked American official to visit the country. Her visit was considered "to be symbolic but nonetheless significant" and her possible visit to Tsitsernakaberd became a subject of much discussion in the Armenian media. The United States had not yet recognized the Armenian Genocide officially and by visiting the genocide memorial, many thought that by her visit, the United States sent a clear political message to Turkey. She visited the memorial on July 5, before leaving for Tbilisi. The wreath that Clinton laid at the memorial read "From Secretary of State Hillary Rodham Clinton" although it was first announced that her visit would be non-official.

UN GA President, 2022
Abdulla Shahid, President of the United Nations General Assembly, visited the memorial and the museum on July 27, 2022 and posted pictures of the visit to Twitter, however he later deleted the post. Turkey's Foreign Ministry stated that Shahid's visit "has been exploited with the purpose of exposing one-sided Armenian claims and it is in that context that he paid a visit to the so-called genocide memorial." Turkey said Shahid "would have been expected to act in a fair and impartial manner, to be more careful and responsible in this regard."

Refusals
Turkish President Abdullah Gül visited Armenia in September 2008 to attend a football match between the Armenian and Turkish national teams in Yerevan. Since the Turkish government denies the fact of genocide, he did not visit the memorial. Other presidents who opted not to pay a visit to Tsitsernakaberd were Syrian President Bashar al-Assad and Iranian Mahmoud Ahmadinejad. They refused to visit the memorial so as not to compromise their bilateral relationship with neighboring Turkey. 

In 2010, Mevlüt Çavuşoğlu, the Turkish President of the Parliamentary Assembly of the Council of Europe (PACE), refused to visit the memorial stating, "it is my own decision. I respect your opinion and you should respect mine."

Politicians

Monarchs
  Grand Duchess Maria Vladimirovna of Russia (2011)
 King Abdullah II of Jordan (2020)

Presidents

 Carlos Menem (1998)
 Emil Constantinescu (1998)
 Petar Stoyanov (1999)
 Constantinos Stephanopoulos (1999)
 Émile Lahoud (2001) 
 Ion Iliescu (2001) 
 Eduard Shevardnadze (2001)
 Aleksander Kwaśniewski (2001)
 Askar Akayev (1997, 2002)
 Leonid Kuchma (2002) 
 Boris Yeltsin (2002) as former President
 Rolandas Paksas (2003)
 Mohammad Khatami (2004) 
 Arnold Rüütel (2004)
 Tarja Halonen (2005)
 Traian Basescu (2006)
 Jacques Chirac (2006)
 Stjepan Mesić (2009) 
 Mikheil Saakashvili (2009) 
 Dimitris Christofias (2009) 
 Boris Tadić (2009) 
 Valdis Zatlers (2009)
 Dmitri Medvedev (2008, 2010)
 Danilo Türk (2010)
 Micheline Calmy-Rey (2011) 
 Dalia Grybauskaite (2011)
 Nicolas Sarkozy (2011) 
 Bronisław Komorowski (2011)
 Michel Sleiman (2011) 
 Heinz Fischer (2012) 
 Alexander Lukashenko (2013)
 Karolos Papoulias (2007, 2014)
 Giorgi Margvelashvili (2014) 
 Didier Burkhalter (2014)
 Nicos Anastasiades (2015)
 Tomislav Nikolić (2014, 2015)
 François Hollande (2014, 2015)
 Vladimir Putin (2001, 2013, 2015)
 Miloš Zeman (2016)
 Emomalii Rahmon (2003, 2017)
 Rumen Radev (2018)
 Michel Aoun (2018)
 Sergio Mattarella (2018)
 Emmanuel Macron (2018)
 Salome Zurabishvili (2019)
 Prokopis Pavlopoulos (2019)
 Gitanas Nauseda (2022)
 Milo Đukanović (2022)

Vice-Presidents
 Bhairon Singh Shekhawat (2005)
 Danilo Astori (2014)
 Mohammad Hamid Ansari (2017)

Prime Ministers

 Pierre Trudeau (1984) as former Prime Minister
 Rafik Hariri (1997)
 Issam Fares (2001)
 Mikhail Kasyanov (2002)
 Sergei Sidorsky (2006)
 Zurab Nogaideli (2007)
 Sergei Stanishev (2007) 
 Viktor Zubkov (2008) 
 Jan Fischer (2010)
 Donald Tusk (2010) 
 Boyko Borisov (2012)
 Bidzina Ivanishvili (2013)
 Irakli Garibashvili (2014, 2021)
 Dmitry Medvedev (2016)
 Giorgi Kvirikashvili (2016) 
 Angela Merkel (2018)
 Mamuka Bakhtadze (2018) 
  Charles Michel (2018)
  Justin Trudeau (2018)
  Charlot Salwai (2018)
  Lee Hsien Loong (2019)
 Giorgi Gakharia (2019)

Speakers

 Gennadiy Seleznyov (1996)
 Christian Poncelet (1999)
 Abd al-Qadir Qaddura (2001) 
 Antje Vollmer (2001)
 Artūras Paulauskas (2005)
 Ingrīda Ūdre (2005)
 Vladimir Konoplyov (2005)
 Anne-Marie Lizin (2005)
 Herman De Croo (2005)
 Gholam-Ali Haddad-Adel (2006) 
 Bogdan Borusewicz (2006)
 Georgi Pirinski (2006)
 Christian Poncelet (2006)
 Jean-Louis Debré (2006)
 Přemysl Sobotka (2008) 
 David Bakradze (2009) 
 Armand De Decker (2009)
 Boris Gryzlov (2010)
 Luka Bebić (2011)
 László Kövér (2011)
 Volodymyr Lytvyn (2011) 
 Nabih Berri (2011)
 Hon Jae Hyon (2012) 
 Jorge Orrico (2012)
 Norbert Lammert (2013)
 Vangelis Meimarakis (2014)
 Yiannakis Omirou (2014)
 Davit Usupashvili (2015)
 Mohammad Jihad al-Laham (2015)
 Zoe Konstantopoulou (2015)
 Sergey Naryshkin (2012, 2015, 2016)
 Jan Hamáček (2015)
 Maja Gojković (2016)
 Nancy Pelosi (2022)

Cabinet ministers
Ministers of Foreign Affairs 

 Ioannis Kasoulidis (1998)
 Eduard Kukan (2000)
 Indulis Bērziņš (2001)
 Toomas Hendrik Ilves (2001)
 Anatoly Zlenko (2001)
 Dimitrij Rupel (2002) 
 Joschka Fischer (2004)
 Per Stig Møller (2004) 
 Philippe Douste-Blazy (2006)
 Micheline Calmy-Rey (2006)
 Frank-Walter Steinmeier (2007) 
 Anna Fotyga (2007)
 Artis Pabriks (2007)  
 Kinga Göncz (2008) 
 Grigol Vashadze (2009)
 Urmas Paet (2009)
 Jorge Taiana (2010)
 Michael Spindelegger (2010)
 Hillary Clinton (2010)
 Peter Maurer (2010)
 Radoslaw Sikorski (2010)
 Kostyantyn Hryshchenko (2011)
 Yang Jiechi (2011)
 Carl Bildt (2011)
 Jonas Gahr Støre (2011) 
 Guido Westerwelle (2012) 
 Erato Kozakou-Marcoullis (2012) 
 Erkki Tuomioja (2012) 
 Audronius Ažubalis (2012) 
 Sergei Martynov (2012) 
 Luis Almagro (2012)
 Jean Asselborn (2012) 
 Edgars Rinkēvičs (2012)
 Miroslav Lajčák (2013) 
 Igor Lukšić (2013) 
 Hoshyar Zebari (2013)
 Karel Schwarzenberg (2008, 2013) 
 Ivan Mrkić (2014)
 Sebastian Kurz (2014)
 Frank-Walter Steinmeier (2014)
 Linas Linkevičius (2014)
 Sergey Lavrov (2007, 2012, 2014, 2021)
 Gebran Bassil (2015)
 Héctor Marcos Timerman (2012, 2015)
 Didier Reynders (2015)
 Lubomír Zaorálek (2015)
 Margot Wallström (2016)
 Mikheil Janelidze (2016)
 Abdullah bin Zayed Al Nahyan (2017)
 Henry Rabary-Njaka (2018)
 Louise Mushikiwabo (2018)
 Régis Immongault Tatangani (2018)
 Taro Kono (2018) 
 Stef Blok (2020)
 Nikos Dendias (2020)
 Ivan Korčok (2021)
 S. Jaishankar (2021) 
 Alexander Schallenberg (2022) 
 Luigi Di Maio (2022)
 Anniken Huitfeldt (2022)

Other ministers

 Živadin Jovanović, Deputy Foreign Minister (1995)
 Igor Sergeyev, Minister of Defence (1998)
 Georgy Boos, Minister of Taxes and Levies (1999)
 Nawaf Massalha, Deputy Foreign Minister (2000)
 Sebouh Hovnanian, Minister of Youth and Culture (2001)
 Gediminas Kirkilas, Minister of National Defense (2005) 
 Joe Hockey, Minister for Human Services (2005)
 Sergey Ivanov, Minister of Defence (2006)
 Christian Estrosi, Territorial Minister (2007) 
 Teodor Melescanu, Defense Minister (2007)
 Alexander Radkov, Minister of Education (2007)
 Andrei Fursenko, Minister of Education and Science (2007)
 Abdujabbor Rahmanov, Minister of Education (2007)
 Juozas Olekas, Minister of National Defense (2007)
 Štefan Harabin, Minister of Justice (2008)
 Pavel Grachov, former Defence Minister (2008)
 Ghia Nodia, Minister of Education and Science (2008)
 Vladimir Matvichuk, Minister of Culture (2008) 
 Marek Maďarič, Minister of Culture (2008)
 Bogdan Klich, National Defense Minister (2009) 
 Patrick Devedjian, Minister of the Implementation of the Recovery Plan (2010)
 Dimitri Shashkini, Minister of Education and Science (2010)
 Henri de Raincourt, Minister of Co-operation (2011)
 Orit Noked, Minister of Agriculture (2012)
 Cornelia Pieper, Minister of State (2012)
 Rasa Juknevičienė, Minister of National Defense (2012)
 Yuli-Yoel Edelstein, Diaspora Affairs Minister (2012)
 Giampaolo Di Paola, Minister of Defence (2012)
 Sergey Shoygu, Minister of Defense (2013)
 Paban Singh Ghatowar, Minister of Parliamentary Affairs (2013)
 Dimitris Avramopoulos, Minister of National Defense (2013)
 Rowsch Shaways, Deputy Prime Minister (2013)
 Jason Kenney, Minister of Employment and Social Development (2014)
 David Lidington, Minister of State for Europe (2014)
 Alexander Chikaidze, Minister of Internal Affairs (2014)
 Juozas Bernatonis, Minister of Justice (2015)
 Baqir Jabr al-Zubeidi, Minister of Transport (2015)
 Arthur Nazarian, Minister of Energy (2015)
 Elias Bou Saab, Minister of Education (2015)
 Chris Alexander, Minister of Citizenship and Immigration (2015)
 José Luis Cancela, Deputy Foreign Minister (2015)
 Christoforos Fokaides, Minister of Defence (2015)
 Michaela Marksová-Tominová, Minister of Labour and Social Affairs (2015)
 Giorgi Mgerbishvilli, Minister of Corrections and Legal Assistance (2015)
 Tea Tsulukiani, Minister of Justice (2015)
 Abdul Rahman Mohammed Al Oweis, Minister of Health (2015)
 Michael Roth, Minister of State for Europe (2015)
 Tinatin Khidasheli, Minister of Defence (2016)
 Tzachi Hanegbi, Regional Cooperation Minister (2017)
 Juma Anad, Defense Minister (2021)

Other government officials

 Alexander Yakovlev, member of the Politburo (1988)
 Alexander Lebed, former Secretary of the Russian Federation Council (1997)
 Stephen Sestanovich, Adviser on newly independent states to the Secretary of State (1999)
 Jamil Al Sayyed, General Security Directorate (2001)
 Anatoly Kvashnin, Chief of the Russian General Staff (2001)
 Sergey Mironov, Chairman of the Federation Council (2002)
 Howard Dean, Chairman of the Democratic National Committee (2005)
 Xu Jialu, Vice-chairman of the Standing Committee of the National People's Congress
 Dimitrios Grapsas, Chief of the Hellenic Army General Staff (2007)
 Vladimir Sergeyevich Mikhaylov, Commander-in-chief of the Russian Air Force (2007)
 Umberto Ranieri, Chairman of the Foreign Affairs Committee (2007)
 Vladimir Churov, Chairman of the Central Election Commission (2008)
 Tod Bunting, Adjutant General of Kansas (2008)
 Gunārs Kūtris, President of the Constitutional Court (2008)
 Jan Kasal, Vice-Chairman of the Chamber of Deputies (2008)
 Frangos Frangoulis, Chief of the Hellenic Army General Staff (2010)
 Micha Lindenstrauss, State Comptroller and Ombudsman (2010)
 Marie L. Yovanovitch, U.S. Ambassador in Armenia (2010)
 Vojtěch Filip, Vice-Chairman of the Chamber of Deputies (2010)
 Valentina Matviyenko, Chairman of the Federation Council (2012)
 John A. Heffern, U.S. Ambassador in Armenia (2012)
 Wolfgang Thierse, Vice-President of the Bundestag (2012)
 Viktor Guminsky, Deputy Speaker of the Belorussian Parliament
 Cao Jianming, Procurator-General of the Supreme People's Procuratorate (2012)
 Marie Ficarra, Member of the New South Wales Legislative Council (2013)
 Amanda Fazio, Member of the New South Wales Legislative Council (2013)
 David Clarke, Member of the New South Wales Legislative Council (2013)
 Fred Nile, Member of the New South Wales Legislative Council (2013)
 Shaoquett Moselmane, Member of the New South Wales Legislative Council (2013)
 Gladys Berejiklian, Minister for Transport of New South Wales (2013)
 Ali Fahad Al-Rashid, head of the foreign affairs committee of the National Assembly (2013)
 Baroness Gloria Hooper, Deputy Speaker and life peer of the House of Lords (2014)
 Baron Faulkner of Worcester, Deputy Speaker and life peer of the House of Lords (2014)
 Anna Azari, Head of Eurasia Division of the Israeli Ministry of Foreign Affairs (2014)
 Victoria Nuland, Assistant Secretary of State for European and Eurasian Affairs (2015)
 Evelyn Farkas, Deputy Assistant Secretary of Defense for Eurasia (2015)
 Cem Özdemir, Co-chairman of the Green Party (2015)
 Andrey Belyaninov, Head of Federal Customs Service (2015)
 Norma Abdala de Matarazzo, First Vice President of the Chamber of Deputies (2015)
 Jacob Lew, United States Secretary of the Treasury (2015)
 Krasimir Karakachanov, Deputy Speaker of the National Assembly (2015)
 Zdeněk Škromach, Vice-President of the Senate (2015)
 Esabelle Dingizian, Deputy Speaker of the Parliament (2015)
 Denise Pascal, Vice President of Parliament (2015)
 Manana Kobakhidze, First Vice-Speaker of the Parliament (2015)
 Carmen Bendovski, former counselor to the Minister of Foreign Affairs (2015)
 Pavel Rychetský, president of the Czech Constitutional Court (2015)
 Harlem Désir, Secretary of State for European Affairs (2015)
 Annick Girardin, Secretary of State for Development (2016)
 Felipe Alejos Lorenzana, First Vice President of Guatemala (2019)

Members of Parliament

 U.S. Senators 
Jack Reed (D-RI) (1997)
Bob Dole (R-KS) (1997)
Dick Durbin (D-IL) (2012)

 U.S. Congressmen
Joseph P. Kennedy II (D-MA) (1993)
Patrick J. Kennedy (D-RI) (1997)
Frank Pallone (D-NJ) (1997)
Dick Gephardt (D-MO) (1998)
James Rogan (R-CA) (1999)
Connie Morella (R-MD) (1999)
Pete Visclosky (D-IN) (2004)
Joseph Crowley (D-NY) (2007)
Adam Schiff (D-CA) (2008)
Devin Nunes (R-CA) (2012)
Ed Royce (R-CA) (2014)
Elliot Engel (D-NY) (2014)
David Cicilline (D-RI) (2014)
Lois Frankel (D-FL) (2014)
Jackie Speier (D-CA) (2015)
Anna Eshoo (D-CA) (2015)
David Trott (R-MI) (2015)
Frank Pallone (D-NJ) (2015)

 Member of the European Parliament (MEPs)
Pia Locatelli, Italy (2007)
Tomasz Poręba, Poland (2010)
Slavcho Binev, Bulgaria (2011)
Evgeni Kirilov, Bulgaria (2011)
Libor Rouček, Czech Republic (2011)
Milan Cabrnoch, Czech Republic (2011)
Laima Andrikienė, Lithuania (2012)
Martin Callanan, UK (2013)
Tatjana Ždanoka, Latvia (2015)
Jaromír Štětina, Czech Republic (2015)
Heidi Hautala, Finland (2015)
Ryszard Czarnecki, Poland (2014, 2015)
Other
 Yossi Sarid (2005)
 François Roelants du Vivier (2006)
 Georges Colombier (2006)
 Margherita Boniver (2007)
 Leoluca Orlando (2007)
 Raffaello De Brasi (2007)
 Christine Egerszegi (2008)
 Arsalan Fathipour (2009)
 Serge Lagauche (2010)
 Caroline Cox (2011)
 Nah Youn Mi (2012)
 Sophie Joissains (2012)
 Bernard Fournier (2012)
 Philippe Marini (2012)
 Leonid Slutsky (2014)
 Dana Reizniece-Ozola (2013)
 Andrejs Klementjevs (2013)
 Inese Lībiņa-Egnere (2013)
 Stéphane Dion (2013)
 Valérie Boyer (2013)
 Guy Teissier (2013)
 Hassan Ayed Bukhamas (2013)
 Stephen Pound (2014) 
 John Whittingdale (2014)
 Mike Gapes (2014)
 Brad Butt (2014)
 Leon Benoit (2014)
 Russ Hiebert (2014)
 Zuzka Bebarová-Rujbrová (2014)
 Bruno Le Roux (2014)
 René Rouquet (2013, 2014)
 Nikolai Ryzhkov (2014)
 Ekin Deligöz (2015)
 Nachman Shai (2015)
 Anat Berko (2015)
 Giorgos Varnava (2015)
 Marios Garoyian (2015)
 Eleni Theocharous (2014, 2015)
 Karl Vanlouwe (2015)
 Gundars Daudze (2015)
 Harold Albrecht (2010, 2015)
 Harry van Bommel (2015)
 Noh Young-min (2015)
 Hannes Weninger (2015)
 Julie de Groote (2015)
 Fatoumata Sidibé (2015)
 André du Bus de Warnaffe (2015)
 Hervé Doyen (2015)
 Simone Susskind (2015)
 Vanessa Matz (2015)
 Karim Van Overmeire (2015)
 László Borbély (2015)
 Mark Pritchard (2016)
 Tali Ploskov (2016)
 Sergejs Potapkins (2016)
 Liana Kanelli (2016)
 Kenneth G. Forslund (2017)

Regional and local
U.S. State legislature and City Council members
Paul Krekorian, Los Angeles City Councilman (2004 and 2013)
John Pérez, Speaker of the California State Assembly (2013)
Katcho Achadjian, Member of the California State Assembly (2013)
Cheryl Brown, Member of the California State Assembly (2013)
Adrin Nazarian, Member of the California State Assembly (2013)
Scott Wilk, Member of the California State Assembly (2013)
Bob Blumenfield, Los Angeles City Councilman (2013) 
Governors
Boris Gromov, Governor of Moscow Oblast (2008)
Georgy Boos, Governor of Kaliningrad (2009)
Georgy Poltavchenko, Governor of Saint Petersburg (2015)

Mayors
Gürbüz Çapan — Esenyurt, Istanbul Province, Turkey (1995) 
Yury Luzhkov — Moscow, Russia (2003, 2005) 
Jacques Peyrat — Nice, France (2007) 
Jean-Claude Gaudin — Marseille, France (2007, 2013)
Gérald Tremblay — Montreal, Canada (2010, 2011)
Bertrand Delanoë — Paris, France (2011)
Osman Baydemir — Diyarbakır, Turkey (2014)
Maysar Haji Salih — Shangal, Iraq (2015)
Delegation of twelve mayors from Germany (2015)
Bekir Kaya - Van, Turkey (2015)
Huseyin Olan - Bitlis, Turkey (2015)
Ozcan Birlik - Mutki, Turkey (2015)
Mehmet Emin Özkan - Güroymak, Turkey (2015)
Avtandil Nemsitsveridze - Mtskheta, Georgia (2015)
Anne Hidalgo - Paris, France (2016)

Leaders or delegations from international organizations
 René van der Linden, President of the Parliamentary Assembly of the Council of Europe (2005) 
 Vladimir Rushailo, Executive Secretary of CIS (2005, 2007)
 Terry Davis, Secretary General of the Council of Europe (2007)
 Kōichirō Matsuura, Director-General of UNESCO (2008) 
 Wilfried Martens, President of the European People's Party (2010)
 Abdou Diouf, Secretary General of Organisation internationale de la Francophonie (2010)
 Thorbjørn Jagland, Secretary General of the Council of Europe (2010)
 Petros Efthymiou, President of the OSCE Parliamentary Assembly (2011)
 Jerzy Buzek, President of the European Parliament (2011) 
 Jean-Claude Mignon, President of the Parliamentary Assembly of the Council of Europe (2013)
 Herwig van Staa, President of the Congress of Local and Regional Authorities of the Council of Europe (2013)
 Yuri Fedotov, Director of the United Nations Office on Drugs and Crime (2013)
 Majed el-Shafie, President and founder of One Free World International (2014)
 Delegation from the All-China Women's Federation (2014)
 Delegation from the European Jewish Parliament (2014)
 Jean-Paul Wahl, European Regional Head of the Parliamentary Assembly of La Francophonie (2015)
 Anne Brasseur, President of the Parliamentary Assembly of the Council of Europe (2015)
 Nils Muižnieks, Commissioner for Human Rights of the Council of Europe (2015)
 Delegation from the Group of States Against Corruption (GRECO) (2015)
 Nikolay Bordyuzha, General Secretary of the Collective Security Treaty Organization (2015)
 Joseph Daul, President of the European People's Party (2015)
 Members of the Executive Bureau of the Democrat Youth Community of Europe (DEMYC) (2015)
 Michael Møller, Director-General of the United Nations Office in Geneva (2015)
 Delegation from the NATO Parliamentary Assembly (2015)
 Delegation from the International Association of Genocide Scholars (2015)
 Michaëlle Jean, Secretary General of Organisation internationale de la Francophonie (2015, 2018)
 Marija Pejčinović Burić, Secretary General of the Council of Europe (2022)
 Abdulla Shahid, President of the United Nations General Assembly (2022)

European Union
 Herman van Rompuy, President of the European Council (2012) 
 José Manuel Barroso, President of the European Commission (2012)
 Donald Tusk, President of the European Council (2015)
 Charles Michel, President of the European Council (2021)

Religious figures

Konrad Raiser, General Secretary of the World Council of Churches (1996)
 Alexy II, Patriarch of Moscow and all Russia (1996)
 Pope John Paul II (2001) 
 Pope Shenouda III, Pope of the Coptic Orthodox Church of Alexandria (2003)
 Stephen Blaire, Bishop of Stockton (2003)
 Robert Edward Mulvee, Bishop of Providence, RI (2003)
 Basil H. Losten, Bishop of the Ukrainian Greek Catholic Church (2003)
 Nicholas Samra, Auxiliary of the Melkite Greek Catholic Eparchy of Newton, MA (2003)
 John Joseph Nevins, Bishop of Venice, FL (2003)
 Howard James Hubbard, Bishop of Albany, NY (2003)
 William Henry Keeler, Roman Catholic Archbishop of Baltimore (2003) 
 Yona Metzger, Chief Rabbi of Israel (2005) 
 Danny Rich, Chief Executive of Liberal Judaism (2007)
 Rowan Williams, Archbishop of Canterbury, Primate of All England (2007) 
 Cardinal Bertone, Camerlengo of the Holy Roman Church and Secretary of State of The Vatican (2008)
 Kirill I, Patriarch of Moscow and all Russia (2010)
 Mir Tahsin Beg, religious leader of the Yazidis (2012)
 Theodore Edgar McCarrick, American cardinal of the Roman Catholic Church (2015)
 Ignatius Aphrem II, Patriarch of the Syriac Orthodox Church (2014)
 Olav Fykse Tveit, General Secretary of the World Council of Churches (2011, 2014)
 Helga Haugland Byfuglien, Bishop of the Church of Norway (2015)
 Bechara Boutros al-Rahi, Patriarch of Antioch, and head of the Maronite Church (2015)
 Kurt Koch, Swiss cardinal of the Roman Catholic Church (2015)
 John X, Orthodox Patriarchate of Antioch and All The East (2015)
 Pope Tawadros II, Pope of the Coptic Orthodox Church of Alexandria (2015)
 Christopher Hill, retired British bishop and president of the Conference of European Churches (2015)
 Richard Chartres, Bishop of London (2015)
 Robert Innes, Bishop in Europe (2015)
 Leonardo Sandri, Prefect of the Congregation for the Oriental Churches (2015)
 Pope Francis (2016)

Other notables

Andrei Tarkovsky, Russian film-maker (1972)
Ian Gillan, English rock singer (1990, 2009)
Cher, Armenian-American singer and songwriter (1993)
Oral Çalışlar, Turkish journalist and writer (1995)
Cengiz Çandar, Turkish journalist and a former war correspondent (1995)
Kirk Kerkorian, American businessman (1997)
Thomas de Waal, British journalist and author (2000)
Prince Richard, Duke of Gloucester (2001)
Birgitte, Duchess of Gloucester (2001)
John Welty, President of California State University, Fresno (2004)
Hrant Dink, Turkish-Armenian journalist assassinated in 2007 (2004)
Paulo Coelho, Brazilian novelist (2004)
Murat Belge, Turkish columnist and academic (2005)
Yehuda Bauer, Israeli historian, scholar of the Holocaust (2005)
Taner Akçam, Turkish historian and sociologist (1995, 2005)
Youri Djorkaeff, French football/soccer player, World and European champion (2006)
Jerry Tarkanian, American basketball coach (2006)
Vladimir Kramnik, Russian World Chess champion (2007)
Hasan Cemal, writer, journalist and grandson of Djemal Pasha, one of the main perpetrators of the genocide (2008)
Tony Iommi, English guitarist (2009)
Geoff Downes, English keyboardist (2009)
Pat Cash, Australian professional tennis player (2009)
Israel Charny, Israeli genocide scholar (2005, 2010)
Vahakn Dadrian, Genocide scholar (2010)
Yves Ternon, French historian (2010)
Leandro Despouy, Argentinian human rights lawyer (2010)
William Schabas, Canadian academic (2010)
Emir Kusturica, Serb filmmaker (2010, 2015)
Alexei Leonov, Soviet astronaut, the first human to conduct a space walk (2010)
Serj Tankian, Armenian-American rock singer (2010) 
Gérard Depardieu, French actor (2010) 
Zhores Alferov, Russian physicist, Nobel Prize winner in Physics (2011)
Steve Wozniak, American computer engineer, co-founder of Apple, Inc. (2011)
Arsen Galstyan, Armenian-born Russian Olympic champion in judo (2012)
Uğur Üngör, Turkish historian (2012)
Alain Delon, French actor (2012)
Anna Chapman, Russian intelligence agent (2013)
Montserrat Caballé, Spanish opera singer (2013)
Sait Çetinoğlu, Turkish historian (2013, 2016)
Joseph Kobzon, Russian singer (2013)
Mario Mazzola, Chief Development Officer at Cisco Systems (2014)
İsmail Beşikçi, Turkish scholar and candidate for the Nobel Peace Prize (2014)
Fatih Akın, Turkish-German film director (2015)
Mardik Martin, American screenwriter (2015)
Evgeny Kissin, Russian pianist (2015)
Kim Kardashian, Armenian-American television personality (2015)
Khloe Kardashian, Armenian-American television personality (2015)
Kanye West, American rapper and record producer (2015)
Charlie Armstrong, American jazz singer (2015)
Daniel Decker, American singer and composer (2015)
Dima Bilan, Russian singer (2016)
Arthur Abraham, German-Armenian professional boxer (2015)
Maria Guleghina, Russian soprano opera singer (2015)
Esther Mujawayo, Rwandan author and Rwandan genocide survivor (2015)
Vic Darchinyan, Australian-Armenian professional boxer (2015)
Richard Hovannisian, Armenian-American historian (2015)
Stephen D. Smith, Executive Director of the USC Shoah Foundation Institute (2015)
André Manoukian, French-Armenian jazz musician (2015)
Cengiz Aktar, Turkish journalist and writer (2015)
Matthias Bjornlund, Danish historian (2015)
Ronda Rousey, American martial artist and UFC champion fighter (2015)
Gegard Mousasi, Dutch mixed martial artist and UFC fighter (2015)
Alexis Ohanian, Co-founder and executive chairman of reddit (2015)
Conan O'Brien, American television host, comedian (2015)
Kemal Yalçın, Turkish writer (2015)
Anatoly Torkunov, rector of Moscow State Institute of International Relations (2015)
Eugene Kaspersky, Russian information specialist and CEO of Kaspersky Lab (2015)
Leymah Gbowee, Liberian peace activist and Nobel Peace Prize laureate (2016)
Shirin Ebadi, Iranian lawyer, former judge and Nobel Peace Prize laureate (2016)
Syeda Ghulam Fatima, Pakistani human and labour rights activist (2016)
Marguerite Barankitse, Burundian human rights activist (2016)
Hina Jilani, Pakistani human rights activist (2016)
John Prendergast, American human rights activist and founding member of Enough Project (2016)
Residente, Puerto Rican musician (2016)
Charles Aznavour, French-Armenian singer (2015, 2016)
George Clooney, American actor (2016)
Matthew Festing, Prince and Grand Master of the Sovereign Military Order of Malta (2016)
Dean Cain, American actor (2017)
Montel Williams, American television personality (2017)
John Malkovich, American actor and director (2017)
Tom Catena, American physician (2018)
Dan Bilzerian, Armenian-American Internet personality and gambler (2018)
Gene D. Block, American biologist, inventor, and chancellor of the University of California, Los Angeles (2018)
David Geffen,  American business magnate, producer, film studio executive, and philanthropist (2018)
Eric Esrailian, Armenian-American film producer (2018)
Terry George, Irish screenwriter and director (2018)
Rudy Giuliani, Donald Trump's personal lawyer and former mayor of New York City (2018)
Kourtney Kardashian, Armenian-American television personality (2019)
Prince Radu of Romania (2019)
Éric Zemmour (2021), 2022 French presidential election candidate
Ardem Patapoutian, molecular biologist, Nobel Prize laureate in Physiology or Medicine (2022)

See also
Armenian genocide
Armenian genocide recognition

References

Armenian genocide commemoration
Museums in Yerevan